Adam Bishop is a professional strongman and the current champion of the Britain's Strongest Man competition. Bishop refers to himself in the media as "one of the little guys" in the sport, despite weighing over 300lbs. Bishop has also competed in rugby, where he played as a winger, and in skeleton bobsleigh.

Strongman career
Bishop started competing in open strongman competitions in 2012, having progressed from the under-105kg category. He entered the heats for the World's Strongest Man in 2015, establishing himself as an up-and-coming talent. 

Bishop steadily improved his standings in the competition, narrowly missing a place in the grand final of the 2016 World's Strongest Man when he was beaten in the Atlas Stones. In the 2018 World's Strongest Man competition, Bishop failed to get past the qualifying heats after losing against Johan Els in the Atlas Stones event.

In the 2019 World's Strongest Man competition, Bishop reached the grand final, coming in ninth place overall.

In the 2020 World's Strongest Man competition, Bishop reached the final once again and improved on his performance from the previous year, placing sixth overall. In December 2020, Bishop competed at the 2020 Shaw Classic and placed sixth overall.

Other work
Bishop worked as an RFC Strength and Conditioning Coach for Harlequin F.C. On 11 February 2021, Bishop left Harlequin F.C. to focus full-time on his strongman career.

Personal records
In strongman:
 Overhead Press –  
 Log Lift –  
 Deadlift (with straps and suit) – 
 Hummer Tire Deadlift –

References 

English strength athletes
English sportsmen

1989 births
Living people